The Last Emperor is the recording name of Jamal Gray, Philadelphia-born hip-hop artist. Gray took his stage name from the Bernardo Bertolucci film epic of the same name (The Last Emperor). He attended and graduated Overbrook High School (Philadelphia) then went on to obtain a Bachelor of Science degree in Political Science/International Relations from Lincoln University.

He moved to New York and began performing at open mic nights. The Last Emperor was featured in a verse on KRS-One's "C.I.A. (Criminals in Action)" with Zack de la Rocha. Two years after moving to New York he was signed to Aftermath Entertainment, and became a protégé of Dr. Dre. In 2003 it was announced that The Last Emperor had signed to Rawkus Records. A few singles were released in a period of 6 months, but the label unexpectedly stopped releasing any music. The Last Emperor then formed Red Planet Music to release his debut album, Music, Magic, Myth. Red Planet's releases are distributed by Raptivism.

He has opened for such acts as the former Def Squad (Redman, EPMD, Das EFX and K-Solo), Common, The Roots, and KRS-One. He has performed at the Lyricist Lounge. He’s traveled around the world performing in places like Denmark (Roskilde Festival), London (Jam in the Park), and Norway (Quart Festival). He also appeared as the guest MC for Gorillaz.

The Last Emperor released his debut album Music, Magic, Myth (Palace of the Pretender in Europe) in 2003. A single, "Black Apache", was released on Red Planet in September 2006.

The Last Emperor's album titled 'Wizards Wardrobe' was slated for a release date 27 June 2010 but never materialized, though a music video for the first single "Fine Art" was released.

Discography 
Albums
 2000: The Legend of Bigfoot (Unofficial, internet leak of early demos)
 2003: Music, Magic, Myth
 2003: Palace of the Pretender (European release of Music, Magic, Myth)
 2018: "Jungle Jim" Season 1 (with Haak Filmore)
 2019: Lord of the Fly (with Haak Filmore)
 2022: The Wizard, The Witch, and The Wolfman (with Haak Filmore)

Mixtapes
 2006: Hidden Treasures
 2009: Science Team...Go!

Singles
 1997: Bums / Monumental / Secret Wars Part 1
 1999: Echo Leader / Charlie / Rap Tyranny
 2000: Fo'rel / Heavyweight Invincible / The Dozen
 2001: The Banger / The Umph
 2003: Who’s That / Prisoner
 2003: Secret Wars Part 2 / Some Love, Some Hate
 2003: Here We Are
 2006: Black Apache / Gangsta Groove
 2010: Fine Art
 2011: Pots and Pans

References

External links 

Living people
Rappers from Philadelphia
Underground rappers
1972 births
21st-century American rappers